Aripiprazole/sertraline (developmental code name ASC-01) is a combination formulation of aripiprazole (Abilify), an atypical antipsychotic, and sertraline (Zoloft), a selective serotonin reuptake inhibitor (SSRI), which was under development by Otsuka Pharmaceutical for the treatment of major depressive disorder (MDD). It combines serotonin reuptake inhibition from sertraline and modulation of dopamine and serotonin receptors from aripiprazole. In July 2017, it was in preregistration in Japan for the treatment of MDD. However, in September 2018, the regulatory submission in Japan for MDD was withdrawn.

See also
 List of investigational antidepressants
 Olanzapine/fluoxetine

References

Antidepressants
Atypical antipsychotics
Combination drugs
Abandoned drugs